Amorphoscelidae is a family of mantises in the order Mantodea.

Subfamilies and Genera 
There are eight genera in two subfamilies recognized in the family Amorphoscelidae:

Subfamily Amorphoscelinae
Distribution: Africa, Yemen, tropical Asia
 Amorphoscelis Stal, 1871
 †Amorphoscelites Gratshev & Zherikhin, 1994
 Bolivaroscelis Roy, 1973
 Caudatoscelis Roy, 1973
 Gigliotoscelis Roy, 1973
 Maculatoscelis Roy, 1973

Subfamily Perlamantinae
Distribution: Africa, Europe
 Paramorphoscelis Werner, 1907 - monotypic - P. gondokorensis Werner, 1907
 Perlamantis Guerin-Meneville, 1843

See also
List of mantis genera and species

References

External links
 Mantodea Species File
  Amorphoscelididae
  Mantis taxonomy

 
Mantodea families